The Milwaukee Youth Symphony Orchestra (MYSO) was founded in 1956 and has grown from one orchestra and 30 students to become the largest after-school youth orchestra in the country. The organization serves 1,000 young musicians who come from more than 200 schools, 60 communities, and as many as 14 counties throughout southeastern Wisconsin and northern Illinois. MYSO reaches an audience of 25,000 annually through more than 100 performances.

In 2015, MYSO received the National Arts and Humanities Youth Program Award, the country's highest honor for after-school youth arts and humanities programs, presented by the President's Committee on the Arts and the Humanities. To date, MYSO is the only youth orchestra in the U.S. to have received this recognition.

MYSO offers more than 40 ensemble and supplemental programs, ranging from symphony and string orchestras, and jazz and steel bands to music theory, composition, and international tours, providing quality musical experiences for a wide range of skill levels.

MYSO is a founding member of the United Performing Arts Fund and is a 501(c)(3) non-profit organization.

References

External links 
 Website

American youth orchestras
1956 establishments in Wisconsin
Musical groups established in 1956
Musical groups from Wisconsin
Youth organizations based in Wisconsin
Organizations based in Milwaukee
Performing arts in Wisconsin